Count Georg Ludwig Friedrich Wilhelm zu Münster (17 February 1776 – 23 December 1844) was a German paleontologist.

Biography
Münster was born on 17 February 1776, in Langelage near Osnabrück. In 1800, he became a Prussian official in the principalities of Brandenburg-Ansbach and Brandenburg-Bayreuth.  He formed a famous collection of fossils, which was ultimately secured by the Bavarian state, and formed the nucleus of the palaeontological museum at Munich.

Münster assisted Georg August Goldfuss in writing his great work, Petrefacta Germaniae.
Louis Agassiz and Georges Cuvier visited him at Bayreuth, where he donated them part of his collection. He died in Bayreuth on 23 December 1844.

The Graf-Münster-Gymnasium in Bayreuth was named after him.

Notes

References

Further reading

External links 
 https://web.archive.org/web/20100117150328/http://www.barnick.de/bt/wer/grafmuenster.htm
 http://did.mat.uni-bayreuth.de/~gmg/info/muenster/muenster.html
 http://fossilien-news.blog.de/?tag=georg-graf-zu-m%FCnster

1776 births
1844 deaths
Counts of Germany
German paleontologists
Honorary Knights Grand Cross of the Order of the Bath
Scientists from Osnabrück